Send Me an Angel is the second studio album by the Italian progressive power metal band Vision Divine released in 2002.

Track listing
All music written by Fabio Lione (Tordiglione) and Olaf Thörsen (Magnani) except where noted. All lyrics written by Olaf Thörsen except track 11 originally written by A-ha.

Credits
Lineup
 Fabio Lione - Vocals
 Olaf Thörsen – Guitars
 Andrea "Tower" Torricini – Bass
 Andrew McPauls – Keyboards
 Mat Stancioiu – Drums

Others
 Simone Bianchi - Cover artwork

References

2002 albums
Vision Divine albums